Karen Alejandra Díaz Sánchez (born 2 August 1998) is a Mexican footballer who plays as a centre-back for Liga MX Femenil club CF Pachuca and the Mexico women's national team.

International career
Díaz was a member of the Mexican squad at the 2018 FIFA U-20 Women's World Cup, but she did not play. She made her senior debut on 5 April 2019 in a 0-2 friendly loss to the Netherlands.

References

External links 
 

1998 births
Living people
Mexican women's footballers
Women's association football central defenders
Footballers from Chihuahua
Liga MX Femenil players
C.F. Pachuca (women) footballers
Mexico women's international footballers
Mexican footballers